Ulrich Duchrow (born 13 June 1935) is a professor of	systematic theology at the University of Heidelberg specialising in 	ecumenical theology and theology-economy issues.
 
He was the co-founder and co-moderator of Kairos Europa, a "European decentralised network of justice, peace and creation initiatives working in collaboration with churches, social movements, trade 	unions and non-governmental organisations, both in and outside Europe, for a more just and tolerant society." 
	
Duchrow is a critic of neoliberalism and global capitalism who has articulated a role for	the church in founding a better world in his writings.

He is a pacifist.

Books
1965, Sprachverstaendnis und Biblisches Hoeren Bei Augustin, J.C.B. Mohr (Paul Siebeck), Tuebingen
1981, Conflict over the Ecumenical Movement: Confessing Christ today in the universal Church, WCC, Geneva 
1987, Global Economy – A Confessional Issue for the Churches?, WCC, Geneva  
1989: Duchrow, Ulrich, Liedke, G.,  Shalom – Biblical Perspectives on Creation, Justice & Peace, WCC, Geneva (also published in German, Korean and Dutch) 
1990: Duchrow, Ulrich, Eisenbürger, G., Hippler, J.(ed.),  Total War Against the Poor: Confidential Documents of the 17th Conference of American Armies, Mar del  Plata, Argentina, 1987, New York CIRCUS Publications, Inc., New York 
1992, Europe in the World System 1492-1992: Is Justice Possible?, WCC, Geneva
1998, Alternatives to Global Capitalism – Drawn from Biblical History, Designed for Political Action, International Books, Utrecht (also published in German, Italian, Spanish, Indonesian, Korean and Chinese) 
1997,  People’s and Social Movements in Western Europe, in:I. Batista (ed.), Social Movements, Globalisation, Exclusion: Challenges and Perspectives, WCC, Geneva 
2002: Duchrow, Ulrich, (ed.),  Colloquium 2000: Faith communities and social movements facing globalization. Studies from the World Alliance of Reformed Churches No 45, Geneva 
2004: Duchrow, Ulrich, Hinkelammert, F.J.,  Property for People, Not for Profit: Alternatives to the Global Tyranny of Capital, Zed Books/CIIR, London and WCC, Geneva (also available in Spanish, Greek and Chinese)

Periodical articles

1997, Christianity in the Context of Globalized Capitalistic Markets, in Concilium 97/2, April 1997 (also reprinted in Dutch, French, German, Italian, Portuguese, Spanish) 
2005 "Ein Briefwechsel zwischen Arm und Reich und seine Folgen" (Briefe an den Reichtum. Hrsg. von Carl Amery. München 2005. ) 
2005  "Biblical perspectives on empire: a view from western Europe. The AISLING Magazine. Issue  32, February 2005.

Other writings
"Ending the Spiral of Violence"  Address at the wreath-laying memorial for victims of western wars before the US and Nato-headquarters in Heidelberg on 1/26/2002 
Desai Letter
Faith Communities and Social Movements Facing Globalization
The God of the European Constitution
God or Mammon
Justice
Life is More than Capital
Literacy in Economic Questions : LA IMC
Neo Liberalism Economic Justice and the Western Church
Private Property– a Growing Danger for Life
The Spirit of Capitalist Globalization and People’s Spirituality in the Light of Faith
Towards an Ethics of Solidarity
World Social Forum 2005

In Spanish 

1997,  El Christianismo en el contexto de los mercados
capitalistas globalizados, en: Concilium no 270, abril 1997

1998,  Alternativas al capitalismo global – extraídas
de la historia bíblica y disenadas para la acción
política, Ediciones ABYA-YALA, Aya-Yala

2002, La liberación inconclusa del espíritu
imperial - Iglesia y teología al final del segundo milenio,
en: Fornet-Betancourt, R. (ed.),Globalización capitalista y
liberación, Editorial Trotta. Madrid

2003,  Duchrow, Ulrich, Hinkelammert, F. J., La vida o el capital.
Alternativas a la dictatura global de la propiedad, San José,
Costa Rica: DEI

References 

Offizielle Homepage von Ulrich Duchrow, Professor für systematische Theologie an der Universität Heidelberg

External links 

Changes Since Basil 1989 Assembly—Interview 
The Kairos America website has a list of articles available online: Ulrich Duchrow - Articles

1935 births
Living people
20th-century German Protestant theologians
German male non-fiction writers
Lutheran pacifists